Valeri Anatolyevich Pavlov (born 7 February 1986) is a Russian professional football player.

Club career
He made his Russian Football National League debut for FC Sokol Saratov on 6 May 2004 in a game against FC Lokomotiv Chita.

External links
 
 

1986 births
Living people
Russian footballers
People from Syzran
Association football midfielders
Russian expatriate footballers
Expatriate footballers in Belarus
FC Sokol Saratov players
FC Nosta Novotroitsk players
FC Rostov players
FC Sodovik Sterlitamak players
FC Neman Grodno players
FC Lada-Tolyatti players
FC Okean Kerch players
FC Smena Komsomolsk-na-Amure players
Belarusian Premier League players
Sportspeople from Samara Oblast